Buccinum strigillatum  is a species of sea snail, a marine gastropod mollusk in the family Buccinidae, the true whelks.

The two subspecies are: 
 Buccinum strigillatum fucanum  Dall, 1907 - the juanmore whelk
 Buccinum strigillatum strigillatum Dall, 1891

Description
The adult shell grows to a length of 50 mm. The white shell has seven hardly inflated whorls with a deep suture and a low spire. The shell is covered with a hirsute epidermis. The sculpture shows numerous narrow primary ridges with channeled interspaces. The oval to oblong aperture is not expanded and shows a deep sinus near the shoulder.

The eggs are deposited on any hard substance, rock, shell, or sponge.

Distribution
This species can be found along the west coast of North America.

References

External links
 

Buccinidae
Gastropods described in 1891